The 1946 NC State Wolfpack football team was an American football team that represented North Carolina State College of Agriculture and Engineering (later renamed North Carolina State University) as a member of the Southern Conference (SoCon) during the 1946 college football season. In its third season under head coach Beattie Feathers, the team compiled an 8–3 record (6–1 against SoCon opponents), was ranked No. 18 in the final AP Poll, lost to Oklahoma in the 1947 Gator Bowl, and outscored opponents by a total of 226 to 101.

Schedule

After the season

The 1947 NFL Draft was held on December 16, 1946. The following Wolfpack players were selected.

References

NC State
NC State Wolfpack football seasons
NC State Wolfpack football